

People
Stan Polovets (born 1963), Russia-born American businessman 
Igor Polovets (born 1969), Russian businessman, owner of RPI Group

Other uses
Kipchaks, a Turkic nomadic people